Rheem Creek is a 3-mile (5 km) long urban stream in western Contra Costa County, California which empties into San Pablo Bay south of Point Pinole. The creek rises from Rolling Hills Cemetery and passes through Rollingwood, the campus of Contra Costa Community College, and the city of San Pablo, California. Near this area at the end of the creek a business park is being built and there is some concern on how the creek may be impacted by the construction. The waterway is named after early local figure William Rheem.

See also
 List of watercourses in the San Francisco Bay Area

Notes

Rivers of Contra Costa County, California
Rivers of Northern California
Tributaries of San Pablo Bay